The Social Democrats (SDK) is a political party in Kyrgyzstan founded in late 2019 by supporters of former President Almazbek Atambayev that split from the Social Democratic Party of Kyrgyzstan (SDKP). After a conflict between Atambaev and his successor President Sooronbai Jeenbekov emerged and deepened in 2018, Atambayev accused of Jeenbekov in attempting to seize authority over the SDKP, a party that Atambayev himself formed in 1990s and served as a leader of.

The SDK participated in the annulled 2020 parliamentary election. Current party leader is Temirlan Sultanbekov.

In the 2021 parliamentary election, the main candidate from the SDK was Almazbek's youngest son, Kadyrbek Atambaev.

History

Background and formation 
According to appeal of the Social Democrats published in 2020, the party "was created back in 2018 under Almazbek Atambayev as a fallback in case the Social Democratic Party of Kyrgyzstan (SDPK) was not allowed to participate in the 2020 parliamentary elections. Atambayev foresaw the whole situation, and, as a wise and far-sighted politician, acted strategically correctly by creating a new platform".

Following the arrest and detention of Atambayev in the pre-trial detention center of the State Committee for National Security of the Kyrgyz Republic, there were speculations that Atambayev's supporters would not be allowed to participate in any elections under the SDKP party-list. Under these conditions, party members registered a "reserved" political organization. Until the spring of 2020, the Social Democrats did not make themselves widely known until 28 May 2020, when the party congress was held, at which Seyidbek Atambaev, the eldest son of Atambayev, was elected chairman of the Social Democrats.

2020 parliamentary elections and protests 
The Social Democrats took part in the October 2020 Kyrgyz parliamentary election, where according to preliminary results, the party failed to overcome the 7% electoral threshold required to enter the Supreme Council as the vast majority of parliamentary seats were won by pro-government parties.

On the evening of 4 October 2020, young party leaders of the Social Democrats Aizhan Myrsan, Temirlan Sultanbekov and Kadyrbek Atambaev refused to accept election results as they accused of them being allegedly rigged and instead called on their supporters to attend demonstration in the Ala-Too Square. The following day on 5 October, supporters of the Social Democrats were the first to protest in the square, with them eventually being joined by representatives of other opposition parties later that day who gathered their supporters at the Opera and Ballet Theatre.

The number of participants in the protest rally increased, by the evening protesters clashed with the police, which ended with the capture of the White House by the opposition, where the parliament and the presidential apparatus were located. The demonstrators released Atambayev from prison, who had been in custody since the Koi-Tash events of 2019. Eight opposition parties have created a Coordinating Council. The council included the Social Democrats, as well as the Respublika, Ata Meken, Butun Kyrgyzstan, Bir Bol, Zamandash, and Ordo parties. However, the Coordinating Council did not receive real political power.

The next day, October 6, the press service of the Social Democrats informed about the unification with members of the SDPK, who "remained faithful to the values of social democracy." The party called the events that took place on the night of 6 October historical in a statement, "Once again, the Kyrgyz people, united by the desire for justice and freedom, overthrew the criminal government."

However, on 9 October, a large rally of the Coordinating Council on Ala-Too Square was dispersed by supporters Sadyr Japarov, and on 10 October, Atambayev was detained by special services and brought back to prison.

Subsequently, participation in the 2020 protests became the basis for bringing to justice one of the leaders of the Social Democrats, Temirlan Sultanbekov, since, according to the prosecution, he allegedly organized riots and tried to seize power. Sultanbekov himself denied this completely.

On 12 February 2021, Temirlan Sultanbekov was elected chairman of the party at the congress of the Social Democrats party with the support of Atambayev.

Representation of the party in government 
There are 30 cities in the Kyrgyz Republic, in a number of them elections to city councils were held in the period 2020-2022, the Social Democrats party took part in 11 of them, and was held in 7 cities, including in the capital of the Republic. The party is officially represented by factions in city councils in Kant, Shopokov, Orlovka, Kemin, Cholpon-Ata and Bishkek. In the elections on April 10, 2022, the party managed to get its deputies into the city council of Kara-Balta.

Seidbek Atambaev won a victory in his constituency in his native Chui region, becoming the representative of the Social Democrats party in the Parliament of the Kyrgyz Republic.

International connections of the party 
The leadership of the "Social Democrats" maintains close ties with the Socialist International. At his request, in May 2022, the Secretary General of the Socialist International, Luis Ayala, came to Kyrgyzstan, which resulted in the official demand of the Socialist International to the authorities of Kyrgyzstan to send Almazbek Atambaev, still in prison, for a medical examination.

In turn, the chairman of the Social Democrats Temirlan Sultanbekov thanked Ayala for her attention to the fate of the founder of the social democratic movement in the Kyrgyz Republic Almazbek Atambayev and said that it is planned to create a group under the Socialist International that will “observe and respond” to the trials in which they participate as accused representatives of the Social Democrats.

Election results

Jogorku Kenesh

References

Political parties in Kyrgyzstan
Political parties established in 2019